The following is a list of notable people associated with Visva- Bharati University and/or Santiniketan, a neighbourhood in Bolpur city in West Bengal, India:

People in the Tagore family

Debendranath Tagore established Santiniketan in 1861, a small place for prayers and meditation with land from Bhuban Mohan Singha of Raipur.
Rabindranath Tagore started a Brahmacharyaashrama in 1901 and it came to be known as Patha Bhavana from 1925. Founded in 1921 by him, Visva Bharati was declared to be a central university in 1951. In 1913, Rabindranath won the Nobel Prize in Literature. He wrote many of his literary classics at Santiniketan.
Rathindranath Tagore, after completing his education first at Santiniketan and then abroad, spent the next four decades of his life serving Santiniketan and Visva Bharati.
Pratima Devi was a talented artist and contributed substantially to improvising and popularising Rabindranath's dance dramas.
Krishna Kripalani, husband of Nandita, a grand daughter of Rabindranath, taught at Santiniketan for about 15 years, His biography of Tagore was amongst the best ever written.
Dwijendranath Tagore, Rabindranath's eldest brother, spent the last twenty years of his life at Santiniketan. He was a poet, musician, philosopher and mathematician.
Dinendranath Tagore, grandson of Dwijendranath, was a talented musician. He codified many of the tunes that appeared impetuously to Rabindranath. He named Rabindranath's songs as Rabindra Sangeet. He was the first principal of Sangit Bhavana.
Indira Devi Chaudhurani, daughter of Satyendranath Tagore, excelled in both Western and Indian classical music and composed Brahmasangit. She wrote the notations for many of Rabindranath's songs.
Abanindranath Tagore, founder of the Bengal school of art joined as chancellor of Visva Bharati in 1942.
Asit Kumar Haldar, was art teacher in Santiniketan Vidyalaya from 1911 to 1915 and was incharge of Kala Bhavana from 1919 to 1921.

People of foreign citizenship/ origin

This list includes names of persons who may have been citizens of British India, but later became citizens of Pakistan/ Bangladesh
Charles Freer Andrews (Deenabandhu Andrews) was a lifelong friend of Rabindranath Tagore and assisted in setting up Visva Bharati.
Leonard Knight Elmhirst, set up the Institute of Rural Reconstruction at Sriniketan.
Khan Abdul Ghani Khan, poet and philosopher, son of Abdul Ghaffar Khan, was sent to Santiniketan, along with Indira Gandhi, by Jawaharlal Nehru. Although known primarily as a poet, he got interested in sculpture, while studying in Santiniketan. He spent his later years in Pakistan.
Martin Kämpchen is a Santiniketan-based translator of Rabindranath Tagore's poems from Bengali to German, author, journalist and social worker.

Anand Yang, historian, was born and initially raised here.
Savitri Devi, the pseudonym of the daughter of a French citizen of Greek-Italian ancestry and an English woman, born Maximiani Portas, was a political activist and writer. She was at Santiniketan for a short while and acquired her pseudonym there.
Affandi, the Indonesian master, was at Santiniketan in 1951. His daughter Kartika Affandi had accompanied him.

Notable alumni

Arts and letters

Film and television

Writing

Visual arts

Music

Performing arts

Scientists and academics

Government and law

Parliamentarians

Judges

Activists

Others

Notable faculty

Other Indians

Satyendra Prasanna Sinha, 1st Baron Sinha, of Raipur, had donated for the construction of Singha Sadan with a clock tower and bell. It was in this building that Oxford University conferred its honorary doctorate on the poet.
Brajendra Nath Seal, philosopher and vice-chancellor of Mysore University, presided over the inauguration of Visva Bharati on 23 December 1921, and presided over the Visva Bharati Society.
Prasanta Chandra Mahalanobis, founder of the Indian Statistical Institute, framed the constitution of Visva Bharati in 1921, and was general secretary from 1921 to 1932.
Nabakrushna Choudhuri freedom fighter was at Santiniketan for a short time. He later became chief minister of Odisha.

See also
List of Vice-Chancellors of Visva-Bharati University

References